was a renowned Japanese photographer.

References

Japanese photographers
1844 births
1897 deaths